Hazel de Bohun Hogarth (1882-1940) was an English badminton and tennis player. Hogarth was capped by England thirteen times between 1904 and 1929 and was attributed as being the player who innovated the backhand serve. She had great success at the All England Championships winning eleven titles.

She also played tennis and competed at The Championships, Wimbledon from 1920 to 1928.

Medal Record at the All England Badminton Championships

References

English female badminton players
1882 births
1940 deaths